Morris Kline (May 1, 1908 – June 10, 1992) was a professor of mathematics, a writer on the history, philosophy, and teaching of mathematics, and also a popularizer of mathematical subjects.

Education and career 
Kline was born to a Jewish family in Brooklyn and resided in Jamaica, Queens.  After graduating from Boys High School in Brooklyn, he studied mathematics at New York University, earning a bachelor's degree in 1930, a master's degree in 1932, and a doctorate (Ph.D.) in 1936. He continued at NYU as an instructor until 1942.

During World War II, Kline was posted to the Signal Corps (United States Army) stationed at Belmar, New Jersey. Designated a physicist, he worked in the engineering lab where radar was developed. After the war he continued investigating electromagnetism, and from 1946 to 1966 was director of the division for electromagnetic research at the Courant Institute of Mathematical Sciences.

Kline resumed his mathematical teaching at NYU, becoming a full professor in 1952.
He taught at New York University until 1975, and wrote many papers and more than a dozen books on various aspects of mathematics and particularly teaching of mathematics. He repeatedly stressed the need to teach the applications and usefulness of mathematics rather than expecting students to enjoy it for its own sake. Similarly, he urged that mathematical research concentrate on solving problems posed in other fields rather than building structures of interest only to other mathematicians.
One can get a sense of Kline's views on teaching from the following:

Critique of mathematics education 
Morris Kline was a protagonist in the curriculum reform in mathematics education that occurred in the second half of the twentieth century, a period including the programs of the new math. An article by Kline in 1956 in The Mathematics Teacher was titled "Mathematical texts and teachers: a tirade".  Calling out teachers that blame students for their failures, he wrote "There is a student problem, but there are also three other factors which are responsible for the present state of mathematical learning, namely, the curricula, the texts, and the teachers." The tirade touched a nerve, and changes started to happen. But then Kline switched to being a critic of some of the changes. In 1958 he wrote "Ancients versus moderns: a new battle of the books". The article was accompanied with a rebuttal by Albert E. Meder Jr. of Rutgers University. He says, "I find objectionable: first, vague generalizations, entirely undocumented, concerning views held by 'modernists', and second, the inferences drawn from what has not been said by the 'modernists'." 
By 1966 Kline proposed an eight-page high school plan. The rebuttal for this article was by James H. Zant; it asserted that Kline had "a general lack of knowledge of what was going on in schools with reference to textbooks, teaching, and curriculum." Zant criticized Kline’s writing for "vagueness, distortion of facts, undocumented statements and overgeneralization."

In 1966 and 1970 Kline issued two further criticisms. In 1973 St. Martin’s Press contributed to the dialogue by publishing Kline’s critique, Why Johnny Can’t Add: the Failure of the New Math. Its opening chapter is a parody of instruction as students’ intuitions are challenged by the new jargon. The book recapitulates the debates from Mathematics Teacher, with Kline conceding some progress: He cites Howard Fehr of Columbia University who sought to unify the subject through its general concepts: sets, operations, mappings, relations, and structures in the Secondary School Mathematics Curriculum Improvement Study.

In 1977 Kline turned to undergraduate university education; he took on the academic mathematics establishment with his Why the Professor Can't Teach: The Dilemma of University Education. Kline argues that the onus on professors in the United States to conduct research misdirects the scholarly method that characterizes good teaching. He lauds scholarship as expressed by expository writing or reviews of original work of others. For scholarship he expects critical attitudes to topics, materials and methods. Among the rebuttals are those by D.T. Finkbeiner, Harry Pollard, and Peter Hilton. Pollard conceded, "The society in which learning is admired and pursued for its own sake has disappeared." The Hilton review was more direct: Kline has "placed in the hand of enemies…[a] weapon". Having started in 1956 as an agitator for change in mathematics education, he became a critic of some trends. Skilled expositor that he was, editors frequently felt his expressions were best tempered with rebuttal.

In considering what motivated Morris Kline to protest, consider Professor Meder’s opinion:I am wondering whether in point of fact, Professor Kline really likes mathematics [...] I think that he is at heart a physicist, or perhaps a ‘natural philosopher’, not a mathematician, and that the reason he does not like the proposals for orienting the secondary school college preparatory mathematics curriculum to the diverse needs of the twentieth century by making use of some concepts developed in mathematics in the last hundred years or so is not that this is bad mathematics, but that it minimizes the importance of physics.

It might appear so, as Kline recalls E. H. Moore’s recommendation to combine science and mathematics at the high school level. But closer reading shows Kline calling mathematics a "part of man’s efforts to understand and master his world", and he sees that role in a broad spectrum of sciences.

Critique of mathematics research 
In Mathematics: The Loss of Certainty (ch. XIII: "The Isolation of Mathematics"), Kline deplored the way mathematics research was being conducted, complaining that often mathematicians, not willing to become acquainted with the (sometimes deep) context needed to solve applied problems in sciences, prefer to invent pure mathematics problems that are not necessarily of any consequence. Kline also blamed the publish or perish academic culture for this state of affairs.

Publications 
 Books
 Introduction to Mathematics (with Irvin W. Kay), Houghton Mifflin, 1937
 The Theory of Electromagnetic Waves (ed), Inter-science Publishers, 1951
 Mathematics in Western Culture, Oxford University Press,1953
 Mathematics and the Physical World, T. Y. Crowell Co., 1959
 Mathematics, A Cultural Approach, Addison-Wesley, 1962
 Mathematics for the Nonmathematician, Dover Publications, 1967
 Electromagnetic Theory and Geometrical Optics (with Irvin W. Kay), John Wiley and Sons, 1965
 Calculus, An intuitive and Physical Approach, John Wiley and Sons, 1967, 1977, Dover Publications 1998 reprint 
 Mathematics for Liberal Arts, Addison-Wesley, 1967, (republished as Mathematics for the Nonmathematician, Dover Publications, Inc., 1985)
 Mathematics in the Modern World (ed), W. H. Freeman and Co., 1968
 Mathematical Thought From Ancient to Modern Times, Oxford University Press, 1972
 Why Johnny Can't Add: The Failure of the New Mathematics, St. Martin's Press, 1973
 Why the Professor Can't Teach: Mathematics and the Dilemma of University Education, St. Martin's Press, 1977
 Mathematics: The Loss of Certainty, Oxford University Press, 1980; OUP Galaxy Books pb. reprint
 Mathematics: An Introduction to Its Spirit and Use; readings from Scientific American
 Mathematics in the Modern World; readings from Scientific American
 The Language of Shapes (with Abraham Wolf Crown)
 Mathematics and the Search for Knowledge, Oxford University Press, 1985

References

Citations

Sources

External links 

 A website having links to two of his books Why Johnny Can't Add? and Why The Professor Can't Teach, a lecture titled Pea Soup, Tripe and Mathematics, and an obituary.
 A wide-ranging 2016 interview: Morris Kline, a renowned mathematician, talks about concepts of mathematics, the new math, and God in a vintage interview. 
 

1908 births
1992 deaths
20th-century American mathematicians
Jewish American military personnel
Courant Institute of Mathematical Sciences alumni
Courant Institute of Mathematical Sciences faculty
American historians of mathematics
Institute for Advanced Study visiting scholars
20th-century American historians
Boys High School (Brooklyn) alumni
Mathematicians from New York (state)
20th-century American Jews
United States Army personnel of World War II
Fulbright alumni